Tenellia netsica is a species of sea slug, an aeolid nudibranch, a marine gastropod mollusc in the family Fionidae.

Distribution
This species originates from the Kaafu Atoll region of the Maldives.

References 

Fionidae
Gastropods described in 1960